Otto Brolo (8 August 1929 – 21 October 2014) was a Guatemalan sports shooter. He competed in two events at the 1968 Summer Olympics.

References

1929 births
2014 deaths
Guatemalan male sport shooters
Olympic shooters of Guatemala
Shooters at the 1968 Summer Olympics
Sportspeople from Guatemala City